Eupithecia nigrodiscata is a moth in the subfamily Larentiinae of the family Geometridae. It is found in Bolivia.

References

Moths described in 1987
nigrodiscata
Moths of South America